The 1928–29 Army Cadets men's ice hockey season was the 26th season of play for the program. The team was coached by Ray Marchand in his 6th season.

Season
Army was welcomed to the ice hockey season by a colder winter than they had seen in recent years. The dip in temperature allowed the team to return to a full schedule on the Stuart Rink for the first time in three years. Unfortunately, the lack of practice time over that stretch was still hampering the team and, after opening the season with a win, Army dropped eight contests in a row. Through that losing skin, the Cadets were barely competitive on most nights, however, as the season progressed the results slowly began to improve.

Team captain Normando Costello was lauded for his play in goal and was regarded as the team's best player for much of the season. Observers put most of the blame on the high numbers of goals against on the poor play of the team's skaters.

Being able to practice on Stuart Rink for most of the season allowed Marchand to coach his team into a decent unit. In the last four games of the year, Army was able to score at least three goals in each game, a far cry from the 13 total markers they had earned in the first nine matches. The steady improvement gave hope to observers that Army could soon produce a winning season.

Roster

Standings

Schedule and Results

|-
!colspan=12 style=";" | Regular Season

† Contemporary Army records include a game against Poughkeepsie, however, those records are confused as to the result of the game. The games is listed as a loss for the Cadets but the score is recorded as 4–2 in their favor.

References

1928–29
Army
Army
Army
Army